Peru competed at the 1992 Summer Olympics in Barcelona, Spain. 16 competitors, 12 men and 4 women, took part in 18 events in 9 sports.

Medalists

Competitors
The following is the list of number of competitors in the Games.

Athletics

Men's 10.000 metres
 Juan José Castillo
 Heat — 30:04.60 (→ did not advance)

Women's Marathon
 Ena Guevara — 3:05.50 (→ 34th place)

Canoeing

Men's Kayak Slalom Singles 
Eric Arenas

Cycling

One male cyclist represented Peru in 1992.

Men's individual pursuit
Tony Ledgard

Modern pentathlon

One male pentathlete represented Peru in 1992.

Individual:
 Luis Alberto Urteaga → 65th place (3503 points)

Shooting

Mixed Trap
Francisco Boza

Mixed Skeet
 Juan Giha

Swimming

Men's 100m Backstroke
 Alejandro Alvizuri
 Heat – 57.72 (→ did not advance, 29th place)

Men's 200m Backstroke
 Alejandro Alvizuri
 Heat – 2:03.10 (→ did not advance, 20th place)

Men's 200m Individual Medley
 Alejandro Alvizuri
 Heat – 2:15.10 (→ did not advance, 45th place)

Women's 100m Breaststroke
 Claudia Velásquez
 Heat – 1:17.80 (→ did not advance, 39th place)

Women's 200m Breaststroke
 Claudia Velásquez
 Heat – 2:47.31 (→ did not advance, 37th place)

Table tennis

Men's singles
Yair Nathan

Men's doubles
Walter Nathan and Yair Nathan

Women's singles
Eliana González

Women's doubles
Eliana González and Magaly Montes

Tennis

Men's Singles Competition
 Pablo Arraya
 First round — Lost to Javier Frana (Argentina) 2-6, 0-6, 7-6, 7-6, 2-6
 Jaime Yzaga
 First round — Defeated Leander Paes (India) 1-6, 7-6, 6-0, 6-0
 Second round — Lost to Pete Sampras (USA) 3-6, 0-6, 6-3, 1-6

Weightlifting

Men's Super-Heavyweight
Rolando Marchinares

See also
Peru at the 1991 Pan American Games

References

Nations at the 1992 Summer Olympics
1992
Summer Olympics